Grevillea maherae is a species of flowering plant in the family Proteaceae and is endemic to the Kimberley region of Western Australia. It is a densely-branched shrub with divided leaves with sharply pointed lobes, and clusters of pinkish red to maroon flowers with a red style.

Description

Taxonomy
Grevillea maherae was first formally described in 2000 by Robert Makinson and Matthew Barrett in the Flora of Australia from specimens collected by Barrett on Mount Elizabeth Homestead in 1998. The specific epithet (maherae) honours Robyn Maher, who discovered the plant.

Distribution and habitat
This grevillea is only known from Mount Elizabeth Station where it grows in grassy woodland.

Conservation status
Grevillea maherae is listed as "Priority One" by the Government of Western Australia Department of Biodiversity, Conservation and Attractions, meaning that it is known from only one or a few locations which are potentially at risk.

See also
 List of Grevillea species

References

maherae
Proteales of Australia
Eudicots of Western Australia
Taxa named by Matthew David Barrett
Taxa named by Robert Owen Makinson
Plants described in 2000